Estradiol-containing birth control may refer to:

 Estradiol-containing birth control pill
 Combined injectable contraceptive